Manchester Cheetham was a parliamentary constituency in the city of Manchester.  It returned one Member of Parliament (MP) to the House of Commons of the Parliament of the United Kingdom, elected by the first past the post system.

The constituency was created for the 1950 general election and abolished for the February 1974 general election.

Boundaries 
1950–1955: The County Borough of Manchester wards of Cheetham, Collegiate Church, Collyhurst, Harpurhey, and St Michael's.

1955–1974: The County Borough of Manchester wards of Cheetham, Collegiate Church, Harpurhey, High Oldham, and Miles Platting.

Members of Parliament

Politics and history of the constituency 
Founded in 1950 the constituency consistently returned Labour Party MPs to the House of Commons in every election until it was dissolved in boundary changes in 1974. The constituency was represented by Harold Lever for its entire 24-year existence, he received between 58% and 70% of the vote. After 1974 the constituency was replaced by Manchester Central.

Election results

Elections in the 1950s

Elections in the 1960s

Elections in the 1970s

References

Cheetham
Constituencies of the Parliament of the United Kingdom established in 1950
Constituencies of the Parliament of the United Kingdom disestablished in 1974